Photinaidae is a family of mantises in the order Neotropical Mantodea, in the superfamily Acanthopoidea. There are about 11 genera and more than 40 described species in Photinaidae.

Genera
These 11 genera belong to the family Photinaidae:
 Cardioptera Burmeister, 1838
 Chromatophotina Rivera, 2010
 Hicetia Saussure & Zehntner, 1894
 Macromantis Saussure, 1871
 Metriomantis Saussure & Zehntner, 1894
 Microphotina Beier, 1935
 Orthoderella Giglio-Tos, 1897
 Paraphotina Giglio-Tos, 1915
 Photina Burmeister, 1838
 Photinella Giglio-Tos, 1915
 Photiomantis Toledo Piza, 1968

References

Further reading

External links

Mantodea
Mantodea families